The Rural Municipality of Cambria No. 6 is a rural municipality (RM) in the Canadian province of Saskatchewan within Census Division No. 2 and  Division No. 1. Located in the southeast portion of the province, it is adjacent to the United States border, neighbouring Divide County in North Dakota.

History 
The RM of Cambria No. 6 incorporated as a rural municipality on December 13, 1909.

Geography

Communities and localities 
The following urban municipalities are surrounded by the RM.

Villages
Torquay

The following unincorporated hamlets are located within the RM.

Localities
Marienthal
Outram
Rafferty

Demographics 

Government 
The RM of Cambria No. 6 is governed by an elected municipal council and an appointed administrator that meets on the second Wednesday of every month. The reeve of the RM is Darwin Daae while its administrator is Monica Kovach. The RM's office is located in Torquay.

See also 
List of rural municipalities in Saskatchewan

References

External links

 
C
Division No. 2, Saskatchewan